Philippine peso coins are issued by the Bangko Sentral ng Pilipinas for circulation in the Philippines and are currently available in seven denominations. The Philippine peso has been in use since Spanish rule.

History

The Philippine peso is derived from the Spanish dollar or pieces of eight brought over in large quantities by the Manila galleons of the 16th to 19th centuries. From the same Spanish peso or dollar is derived the various pesos of Latin America, the dollars of the US and Hong Kong, as well as the Chinese yuan and the Japanese yen.

Pre-Hispanic era
Gold was an important medium of exchange in the various territories of pre-Hispanic Philippines, in the form of stamped gold beads called piloncitos and gold barter rings. The original silver currency unit was the rupee or rupiah (known locally as salapi), brought over by trade with India and Indonesia. The salapi continued under Spanish rule as a teston worth four reales or half a Spanish peso.

Spanish administration
The Spanish silver peso worth eight reales was first introduced by the Magellan expedition of 1521 and brought in large quantities by the Manila galleons after the 1565 conquest of the Philippines; see Spanish dollar. The local salapi continued under Spanish rule as a half-peso coin. Additionally, Spanish gold onzas or eight-escudo coins were also introduced with identical weight to the Spanish dollar but valued at 16 silver pesos.

Until the Manila mint was established in 1857 the Philippines had no money of its own. Gold and silver coins brought to it by Spain, China and neighboring countries were in circulation. Denominations consisted of
 In gold escudos: , 1, 2, 4, 8 escudos; each escudo worth approximately 2 silver pesos or 16 reales.
 In silver reales: , 1, 2, 4, 8 reales; one peso equals 8 reales.
 In copper: , 1, 2 cuartos; 20 cuartos in a real and 160 cuartos in a peso.

The Casa de Moneda de Manila (or Manila mint) was founded in 1857 in order to supply smaller Philippine currency after the California gold rush of 1848 made silver more expensive and drained the colony of silver and small gold coins. It produced the following denominations according to Spanish standards, with 100 centimos equal to a peso:
 In gold: 1, 2, 4 pesos; the 4 pesos weighing 6.766 grams of 0.875 fine gold
 In silver: 10, 20, 50 centimos; the 50 centimos weighing 12.98 grams of 0.9 fine silver (fineness reduced to 0.835 in 1881)

The dearth of pre-1857 copper coins were addressed by counterfeit two-cuarto coins (worth 1/80th of a peso) made by Igorot copper miners in the Cordilleras. In 1897 Spain brought over 1-peso silver coins as well as 5 and 10 centimos de peseta to be accepted by Filipinos as 1 and 2 centimos de peso.

United States administration
The United States also struck coins for use in the Philippines from 1903 to 1945. Denominations included the  centavo, one centavo, five centavo, 10 centavo, 20 centavo, 50 centavo, and one peso.  The  and 1 centavo coins were struck in bronze, the 5 centavo struck in copper (75%) - nickel (25%), the 10, 20, 50 centavo and peso coins were struck in a silver composition. From 1903 to 1906, the silver coins had a silver content of 90%, while those struck after 1906 had a reduced silver content of 75% for 10 through 50 centavos and 80% for the peso. In both cases the silver was alloyed with copper.

The obverse of these coins remained largely unchanged during the years 1903 to 1945. The  centavo, one centavo, and five centavo coins depict a Filipino man kneeling against an anvil, with a hammer resting at his side. He is on the left side (foreground), while on the right side (background) there is a simmering volcano, Mt. Mayon, topped with smoke rings. This figure is an allegory for the hard work being done by the native peoples of the Philippines in building their own future.

The obverse of the 10, 20, 50 centavo, and peso coins are similar, but they show the figure of Liberty, a standing female figure (considered by many to be the daughter of the designer 'Blanca') in the act of striking the anvil with a hammer. This was done to show the work being done by Americans in building a better Philippines. Liberty appears on the silver coins, instead of the base metal coins.

The reverse of the coins comes in two varieties. The earliest coins were minted when the islands were a US Territory, and they bear the arms of the US Territories. This is a broad winged eagle, sitting atop a shield divided into two registers. The upper register has 13 stars, and the lower register has 13 vertical stripes. The date appears at the bottom, and "United States of America" appears at the top.

When the islands became a US Commonwealth, the arms of the Commonwealth were adopted. This seal is composed of a much smaller eagle with its wings pointed up, perched over a shield with peaked corners, above a scroll reading "Commonwealth of the Philippines". It is a much busier pattern, and widely considered less attractive.

Coins were minted at the Philadelphia, San Francisco, Denver, and (after it was opened in 1920) Manila mints. Most of the coins struck at the Manila mint occurred after 1925.

Proof sets were struck for collectors from 1903 to 1908. It is likely that a large majority of these sets remained unsold at the time they were issued. The recorded mintage for sets in 1905, 1906, and 1908 is a modest 500.

Defenders of Corregidor threw a large number of silver coins into the ocean, rather than allow the Japanese to accumulate this wealth. A great deal of the booty was later recovered, but many of those were badly corroded.

Among the rarest coins in the U.S. Philippines series from the collectors' standpoint are the 1906-S One Peso, the 1916-S Five Centavos, the 1918-S Five Centavo Mule, the 1903-S Twenty Centavos (especially in Mint State) and the 1915-S One Centavo.

Three Commemorative coins were minted to celebrate the Commonwealth in 1936. They show President Franklin D. Roosevelt, Commonwealth President Manuel L. Quezon and U.S. High Commissioner Frank Murphy, who also has served as the last Governor General of the Islands. The 50 Centavo commemorative has a reported mintage of 20,000 pieces, was struck in 75% silver, and weighs 10 grams (the same specifications as other 50 centavos). The two varieties of One Peso commemorative had reported mintages of 10,000 pieces. They weigh 20 grams, and are 90% silver.

Culion leper colony coinage

The Culion leper colony was established in May 1906 by the Insular Government of the Philippine Islands in Culion Island, Palawan. It was modeled after the Kalaupapa Leprosy Settlement in Molokai, Hawaii. It was issued its own Special Culion Currency due to the erroneous belief that leprosy could be transmitted via handling of money. Only inmates of the colony were allowed to use what was commonly known as "leper money." It was prohibited for inmates to use regular Philippine currency, and it was prohibited for non-lepers to use the Culion currency. The first and second issues (1913 and 1920) were struck in aluminum by the Frank & Co. die establishment. All subsequent issues were minted by the newly reopened Manila Mint. The third issue (1922) was also aluminum, but the fourth, fifth, and sixth issues (1925, 1927, and 1930) were in copper-nickel alloy. The sixth issue was the final issue. In total, around 169,000 coins were struck for the Culion leper colony, between 1913 and 1930.

By the 1920s, the segregation laws were relaxed. Non-leper settlers (locally known as sano) started coming into the island, mostly family members of the thousands of inmates who were forcibly relocated to the island during via the segregation program. However, exchange of money between the leper inmates and the non-leper settlers was still prohibited. In 1942, during the Japanese invasion of the Philippines in World War II, Culion was cut off from Manila, leading to a shortage of currency. The local Culion authorities issued an emergency currency printed on paper, with centavo denominations in pink paper and peso denominations in blue paper. The Japanese later attacked the island and destroyed its port, radio tower, and electricity generators, cutting off all supplies and contact to the island. This resulted in widespread starvation that resulted in 2,000 deaths. People who fled the island were also killed. It wasn't until 1945 that the US Army Air Corps was able to drop supplies on the island by parachute.

After independence, the segregation law was revised to allow private home isolation and treatment, removing the need for a leper colony. By the 1980s, multi-drug therapies had reduced the status of leprosy to a treatable disease. In 2006, it was declared a leprosy-free area by the World Health Organization. The currency is discontinued but remains popular among coin collectors.

After Philippine independence, 1946-1994

After the granting of independence to the Philippines in 1946, no coins were minted for the Philippine Republic until 1958, other than a small silver commemorative issue in 1947 to honor General Douglas MacArthur. A total of 200,000 50 centavos and 100,000 one peso coins were minted with the general's image on the obverse and the national coat-of-arms on the reverse.  Struck at the San Francisco Mint, they carry the "S" mintmark below the date.

In 1958, the 20 centavos was replaced with a 25 centavos and all coins were resized to be the same diameter as their US equivalents, albeit in more base metals, other than the centavo.  The same seated man with anvil and volcano or standing liberty with anvil and volcano designs were retained for the obverses while the seal of the Central Bank of the Philippines dominated the reverse.  These coins were minted by the Philadelphia Mint from 1958 through 1963, and then by the Royal Mint in England and the Vereinigte Deutsche Metallweke in West Germany in 1965 (dated 1964) and 1966.  In view of all subsequent issues using the Tagalog language, this coinage is often referred to as the English Series since it uses the English language.

The next series was introduced in 1967, introducing images of various Philippine national heroes, and the use of the Tagalog (or "Pilipino") language, hence being called the Pilipino Series.  The sizes of the coins were reduced.  These coins were struck by the various US mints, except for some 50 centavos pieces dated 1972 which were minted in Singapore, and a couple commemorative issues struck by the Sherritt Mint in Canada.  In 1972 the one peso denomination was reintroduced.

In commemoration of Fedinand Marcos' declaration of Martial Law (which he titled "Ang Bagong Lipunan," the new society), a new series of coinage was issued in 1975, referred to as the Ang Bagong Lipunan Series.  The 50 sentimo was done away with as a denomination and a new 5 peso issue took its place.  A variety of mints provided these coins, including the Royal Mint in England and the Vereinigte Deutsche Metallweke in West Germany, Philadelphia and San Francisco mints in the US, the Franklin Mint (a private mint also in the US), the Sherritt Mint in Canada, and finally the Philippine's own mint, once it was opened and able to produce coinage.  From this point on, the Philippine Mint (Bangko Sentral Pilipinas, "BSP") produced nearly all Philippine coinage.

After eight years, the Ang Bagong Lipunan series gave way to a new series titled the Flora and Fauna Series, in which the coins, in addition to featuring various Philippine national heroes as before, also began featuring various plant and animal life forms native to the Philippines.  The 50 sentimo and 2 piso denominations were reintroduced, which latter had not been struck as a coin since the Spanish had struck it in gold.  The 5 piso denomination was stopped, but resumed (in a new smaller size) concurrent to the final four years of the Improved Flora and Fauna Series which featured reduced sizes for all denominations.  The Flora and Fauna Series was struck from 1983 through 1994.

Philippine issues since 1995

In 1995, the new BSP Series was introduced, which is still circulating today. Only this current series of coins are legal tender after January 2, 1998, when the Bangko Sentral ng Pilipinas issued BSP Circular No. 81 which called for the demonetization of all previous existing Central Bank coins minted before 1995. Coins under this series originally included 1, 5, 10 and 25-sentimo, 1-piso and 5-piso. A bimetallic 10-piso coin was added in 2000 to replace the 10-piso note.

Recently, fake 10 and 5-piso coins dating 2001 and 2002 have entered circulation. Because of this, the Bangko Sentral ng Pilipinas issued a warning and several security measures on importing and falsifying Philippine coins. And it is because the BSP has announced that there is an artificial shortage of coins last June 2006. The BSP has asked the public to use all small coins or to have them exchanged for banknotes in local banks or other financial institution.

Denominations worth 25 sentimo (~US$0.005) and below are still issued but have been increasingly regarded as a nuisance. Proposals to retire and demonetize all coins less than one peso in value have been rejected by the government and the BSP.

On November 29, 2017, the Bangko Sentral ng Pilipinas announced the release of the first coin in the New Generation Currency Series for circulation starting December 2017. As a tribute to the 154th birth anniversary of Andres Bonifacio, the first coin to be released was the new silver-colored 5-peso coin featuring Bonifacio on the obverse, replacing Emilio Aguinaldo. The reverse features the Tayabak plant and the new BSP logo. The rest of the NGC coin series were presented on March 26, 2018.

The rest of the series was released March 2018 consisting of 1, 5 and 25-sentimo and 1, 5 and 10-piso. A 20-peso coin was added to the series on December 17, 2019, in order to replace the overused 20-piso banknote with a coin that could last 10–15 years longer in circulation.

Formerly circulating coins

Spanish administration

The Philippines under U.S. Sovereignty

Commonwealth Issues
In 1935, when the Commonwealth was established by the Congress of the United States, they issued a three-piece commemorative set (that sold very poorly) to commemorate the occasion. In 1937, the Commonwealth Arms were adapted to all circulating coinage. (Mint marks are M for Manila, D for Denver, S for San Francisco, and no mint mark for Philadelphia)

Commonwealth Commemorative Issues

English series

In 1958, a new, entirely base metal coinage was introduced, consisting of bronze 1 centavo, brass 5 centavos and nickel-brass 10, 25 and 50 centavos. This series was demonetized after August 31, 1979, except for the 10-centavo that was demonetized only after January 2, 1998.

Pilipino series

In 1967, the coinage was altered to reflect the use of Filipino names for the currency units. 1-piso coins were reintroduced in 1972. The series was demonetized after January 2, 1998.

Ang Bagong Lipunan series

In 1975, the Ang Bagong Lipunan (The New Society) series, was introduced with ₱5 coins included for this series. Cupro-nickel replaced nickel-brass that year. The series was demonetized after January 2, 1998.

{|class="wikitable" style="font-size: 90%"
|-
! colspan="11"| Ang Bagong Lipunan Series'''
|-
! colspan="2" rowspan="2" |Image
! rowspan="3" |Face Value
! colspan="3" |Technical parameters
! colspan="3" |Description
! colspan="2" rowspan="2" |Year of
|-
! rowspan="2" | Diameter 
! rowspan="2" | Mass 
! rowspan="2" | Composition 
! rowspan="2" | Edge 
! rowspan="2" | Obverse 
! rowspan="2" | Reverse 
|-
! Obverse 
! Reverse
! first minting 
! demonetization
|-
| style="text-align:center; background:#fff;"| 
| 
| 1¢
| 16.5 mm (length of side of rounded square shaped edge)
| 1.22 g
| Aluminum
| Plain
| State title, Lapulapu, value
| "ANG BAGONG LIPUNAN," BSP logo, year of minting
| March 31, 1975
| January 2, 1998
|-
| style="text-align:center; "| 
| 
| 5¢
| 19 mm (8-pointed rounded scallop edge)
| 2.40g
| Brass
| Plain
| State title, Melchora Aquino, value
| "ANG BAGONG LIPUNAN," BSP logo, year of minting
| March 31, 1975
| January 2, 1998
|-
| style="text-align:center; background:#fff;"| 
| 
| 10¢
| 17.5 mm
| 2g
| rowspan="3"| Cupro-Nickel
| rowspan="3"| Reeded
| State title, Francisco Baltazar, value
| rowspan="2"| "ANG BAGONG LIPUNAN," BSP logo, year of minting
| rowspan="4"| March 31, 1975
| rowspan="4"| January 2, 1998
|-
| style="text-align:center; background:#fff;"| 
| 
| 25¢
| 21.0 mm
| 4g
| State title, Juan Luna, value
|-
| style="text-align:center; background:#fff;"| 
| 
| ₱1
| 29 mm
| 9.5g
| State title, José Rizal, value
| "ANG BAGONG LIPUNAN," coat of arms with the scroll text altered to "ISANG BANSA, ISANG DIWA" ("One Nation, One Spirit") with two digits of the year minted on both sides, bank title
|-
| style="text-align:center;"| 
| 
| ₱5
| 35 mm
| 22g
| Nickel
| Plain
| "ANG BAGONG LIPUNAN," "Setyembre 21, 1972"  ("September 21, 1972"), Ferdinand Marcos, year of minting
| State title, coat of arms with the scroll text altered to "ISANG BANSA, ISANG DIWA" ("One Nation, One Spirit")
|}

Flora and Fauna series

The Flora and Fauna series was introduced in 1983 which included ₱2 coins. This series used the Optima typeface. ₱5 coins were reintroduced in 1991, and reduced-size 25-sentimo, 50-sentimo, ₱1 and ₱2 coins were distributed starting Dec 1992. Production of 50-sentimo and ₱2 coins ceased in 1995. The series was demonetized after January 2, 1998.

The Flora and Fauna series had an error for some coins, in 1983. The text for 10 centavos for scientific name of the Philippine goby was "Pandaka pygmea'" instead of "Pandaka pygmaea" and the 50 centavo coin for the Philippine eagle was "Pithecobhaga jefferyi" instead of "Pithecophaga jefferyi".

Circulating coins
BSP Coin series

In December 1995, a new set of coins and notes was issued which carried the new logo of the BSP: 5- and 1-piso and 25-, 10-, 5- and 1-sentimo, with the aim of carrying out the demonetization of all previous series on January 3, 1998. On July 10, 2001, BSP issued the 10-piso coin for general circulation to commemorate its 8th anniversary. It has the profiles of Andres Bonifacio and Apolinario Mabini in a con-joint or in tandem manner on the obverse side. The reverse side bears the seal of the Bangko Sentral ng Pilipinas which is consistent with the common reverse design of the other six denominations. This has been an additional denomination to the current coin circulation and a replacement for the 10-piso NDS banknote. The series used the Optima typeface.

The 1995, 1997 and 1998 5 peso coins had no mint marks, but coins issued from 1999 onward had mint marks. The 1995, 1997, and 1998 coins (with no mint mark) were minted by the Royal Canadian Mint. However, not all 1997 and 1998 coins were minted by the Royal Canadian Mint, quite a few were minted by the BSP (with mint mark).

New Generation Currency Coin series

On March 26, 2018, the Bangko Sentral ng Pilipinas introduced the New Generation Currency Coin Series'' which was circulated through banks the next day. The new series features native Philippine flora. Sentimo denominated coins depict a stylized representation of the Philippine flag on the obverse. Peso denominated coins depict the portraits of renowned national heroes of the Philippines on the obverse. However, the 10-sentimo coin is not included in this series, because it was removed as a general circulation coin. This series uses the Twentieth Century and the Arial typeface (20 peso coin only).

In July 2019, the BSP announced plans to replace the ₱20 bill with a ₱20 coin by the 1st quarter of 2020.

In September 2019, Benjamin Diokno (the current BSP Governor) finally came up on having a solution for the ₱5 coin that is always confused with the current ₱1 coins, the new ₱5 coin that will be minted will have a nonagonal shape. Also, the ₱20 coin was finally designed in the same month and both coins were released on December 17, 2019.

Current legal tender commemorative coins

On December 9, 2011, the Bangko Sentral ng Pilipinas issued a commemorative one-peso coin in celebration of the 150th Birth Anniversary of José Rizal. The coins are in the same dimensions as the circulating one peso coins with Rizal's face from the front instead of in profile. The new coin also has the new logo of the central bank and is legal tender with the current series.

On December 18, 2013, the Bangko Sentral ng Pilipinas issued a commemorative ten-peso coin in celebration of the 150th Birth Anniversary of Andres Bonifacio. The coins are in the same dimensions but the design changed. These also featured the new logo of the central bank and is also legal tender.

On December 22, 2014, the BSP issued three commemorative coins, a five-peso coin to commemorate the 70th Anniversary of the Leyte Gulf Landings, a five-peso coin honoring Overseas Filipinos with the theme "Bagong Bayani" and a ten-peso coin celebrating the 150th Anniversary of the birth of Apolinario Mabini.

On January 14, 2015, the BSP issued two limited edition commemorative coins for the papal visit of Pope Francis, a 50-peso coin made of nickel-brass steel and a 500-peso coin made of Nordic gold with gold plating. A special logo with the theme "Mercy and Compassion" was minted on the reverse side of both coins, following the Pope's papal bull of indiction proclaimed later that year to mark the Extraordinary Jubilee of Mercy. The coins are minted under a licensing agreement with the Vatican. Both coins are legal tender. Production and issuance of two additional silver and gold coins in 1000-peso and 10,000-peso denominations were called off due to limitations in the procurement process.

On December 21, 2015, the BSP issued a commemorative 10-peso coin in honor of General Miguel Malvar, in time for the 150th year birth anniversary.

On January 27, 2017, the BSP issued a commemorative one-peso coin in honor of the Philippines' Chairmanship of the Association of Southeast Asian Nations (ASEAN).

In August and November 2017, the BSP issued commemorative one-peso coins and 10-peso coin both honoring the 100th anniversary of the birth of educator and historian Horacio de la Costa and the 150th anniversary of the birth of three officers of the Philippine Revolutionary Army, Generals Artemio Ricarte, Isidoro Torres and Antonio Luna.

On March 11, 2022, the BSP issued a commemorative 125-peso coin to honor the 125th martyrdom anniversary of Dr. Jose Rizal.

Summary of the Philippine coin series

Notes

References

External links
 Sinsilyo

Coins of the Philippines
Currencies of the Philippines
Philippines